Budna Vas is a settlement in the Municipality of Sevnica in central Slovenia. The area is part of the historical region of Lower Carniola. The municipality is now included in the Lower Sava Statistical Region. 

The local church is dedicated to Saint Nicholas and belongs to the Parish of Šentjanž. It dates to the 17th century and has a single-aisled nave with a flat wooden ceiling.

References

External links
Budna Vas at Geopedia

Populated places in the Municipality of Sevnica